Benjamin Noyes Hulburd (May 21, 1898 – April 9, 1964) was an American attorney, politician, and judge who served as an associate justice of the Vermont Supreme Court from 1955 to 1959, and chief justice from 1959 to 1963.

Early life and education
Hulburd was born in Hyde Park, Vermont on May 21, 1898, the son of Roger W. Hulburd and Mabel Julia (Noyes) Hulburd. He graduated from the University of Vermont in 1920, and received his Master of Arts degree from the University of Wisconsin–Madison in 1924. In 1928, he received his LL.B. from Harvard Law School and was admitted to the bar.

Career
Hulburd began a practice in Hyde Park in 1928. A Republican, he was elected state's attorney of Lamoille County soon after becoming a lawyer, and he served until 1935. Hulburd also served in local offices including school board member and village trustee. In 1940, Hulburd was elected Lamoille County Probate Judge, and he served from 1941 to 1949. In 1948, Hulburd was a delegate to the Republican National Convention. He was elected to the Vermont House of Representatives later that year, and he served during the session of 1949.

In 1949, Hulburd was appointed to the Vermont Superior Court. He served until 1955, and advanced through seniority to become the court's chief judge. In 1955, Hulburd was appointed as an associate justice of the Vermont Supreme Court, in keeping with Vermont's tradition of promoting the chief judge of the Superior Court. He succeeded Olin M. Jeffords, who was promoted to chief justice.

In 1959, Hulburd was appointed as Chief Justice, succeeding Walter H. Cleary. He served until retiring in 1963 because of ill health, and was succeeded by James Stuart Holden.

Death 
After joining the superior court, Hulburd became a resident of South Burlington, Vermont. He died in a Burlington, Vermont hospital on April 9, 1964, and was buried at Hyde Park Village Cemetery.

Family
In 1928, Hulburd married Dorothy Elizabeth Poustie (1901-1968) of Cambridge, Massachusetts. They were the parents of sons Roger William (1930-1998) and George Poustie (b. 1932), and daughter Dale Elizabeth (b. 1932), the wife of Donald L. LeBlanc of Andover, Massachusetts.

References

Sources

Newspapers

Books

Internet

1898 births
1964 deaths
People from Hyde Park, Vermont
People from South Burlington, Vermont
University of Vermont alumni
University of Wisconsin–Madison alumni
Harvard Law School alumni
Vermont lawyers
State's attorneys in Vermont
School board members in Vermont
Republican Party members of the Vermont House of Representatives
Vermont state court judges
Justices of the Vermont Supreme Court
Burials in Vermont
20th-century American politicians
20th-century American judges
20th-century American lawyers